Sholto George Watson Douglas, 19th Earl of Morton, DL (5 November 1844 – 8 October 1935) was a major landowner in Scotland, a businessman with mining investments in what is now Svalbard, Norway, and politician, serving as a representative peer (1886–1935) after being elected by the Peerage of Scotland.

Biography
In the early 20th century, entrepreneurs and national governments staked claims in the Arctic archipelago of Svalbard, to develop resources and mining. Britain, the Netherlands, and Denmark-Norway all had interests there, soon followed by the Russian Empire.

The Earl of Morton had several Arctic interests. He and Alexander Bruce Hugh, 6th Lord Balfour of Burleigh had major shares in the little-known Spitzbergen Coal and Mineral Ltd of London. In 1906 Morton became involved, with his son Rory, in the Spitzbergen Mining and Exploration Syndicate (SMES). Together with other major investors, they claimed land on the island of Spitsbergen, now Svalbard, Norway, and that year opened a coal mine at Camp Morton. He and his sons Rory, Charley, Ronald and William sailed to Norway and Spitsbergen from May to July 1906 on the SY Latona. The company was renamed Northern Enterprise Company Ltd (NEC) in 1910. Coal was mined there into the mid-1920s. NEC sold the properties to the Norwegian government in 1932.

Douglas was elected by the Peerage of Scotland as a representative peer to the British House of Lords in 1886, serving in that position to his death on 8 October 1935. He was a landowner and resident of Conaglen House in Ardgour, Argyllshire. He served as a Deputy Lieutenant for the County of Argyll from May 1901.

His eldest son, Sholto Charles, Lord Aberdour, predeceased his father on 29 September 1911. The Morton honours passed to the 19th Earl's grandson, Sholto Charles John Hay Douglas (1907–1976).

References

1844 births
1935 deaths
Earls of Morton
Scottish representative peers
Scottish landowners
Deputy Lieutenants of Argyllshire